Zeltnera is a genus of flowering plants in the gentian family. It was erected in 2004 when the genus Centaurium (the centauries) was split. Genetic analysis revealed that Centaurium was polyphyletic, made up of plants that could be grouped into four clades. Each became a genus. Centaurium remained, but it is now limited to the Eurasian species. The Mexican species now belong to genus Gyrandra, and the Mediterranean and Australian plants are in genus Schenkia. The new name Zeltnera was given to this genus, which contains most of the North American centauries. There are about 25 species.

Plants of this genus are annual, biennial, or short-lived perennial herbs. They are taprooted or have fibrous root systems. They produce one or more branching stems which are often ridged and sometimes winged. The leaves are gathered around the lower stem or arranged along the length of the stem. They vary in shape, from linear to lance-shaped to oval, and are green or yellowish. The inflorescence is variable in arrangement. The flower has a tubular throat that opens into a flat corolla with four or five lobes. It may be any shade of pink or white, and the throat is usually paler, to white or yellowish, or occasionally patterned with green. The fruit is a small capsule containing up to 700 minute seeds. Zeltnera and Centaurium species differ mostly in the morphology of the style and stigma, as well as the shape of the fruit capsule.

Zeltnera can be subdivided into three groups, a division which is supported by DNA evidence but is most obvious in terms of geography. They are casually named the "Californian group", the "Texan group", and the "Mexican group". The first group is distributed from British Columbia south through the West Coast of the United States and into Baja California. The "Texan" plants occur from Arizona to Oklahoma in the US and throughout northern Mexico. The "Mexican group" occurs in Mexico, Central America, and parts of South America. The range may extend north into Arizona.

Genus Zeltnera was named for the Swiss botanists Louis and Nicole Zeltner, who have researched Centaurium and other gentians.

Species include:
Zeltnera abramsii
Zeltnera arizonica - Arizona centaury
Zeltnera beyrichii - quinineweed
Zeltnera breviflora
Zeltnera calycosa - Arizona centaury, shortflower centaury, rosita, Buckley centaury
Zeltnera davyi - Davy's centaury
Zeltnera exaltata - desert centaury
Zeltnera gentryi
Zeltnera glandulifera - sticky centaury
Zeltnera madrensis
Zeltnera martinii
Zeltnera maryanna - gypsum centaury
Zeltnera muehlenbergii - Muhlenberg's centaury
Zeltnera multicaulis - manystem centaury
Zeltnera namophila - springloving centaury
Zeltnera nesomii
Zeltnera nevadensis
Zeltnera nudicaulis - Santa Catalina Mountain centaury
Zeltnera pusilla
Zeltnera quitensis - Britton's centaury
Zeltnera setacea
Zeltnera stricta
Zeltnera texensis - Lady Bird's centaury
Zeltnera trichantha - alkali centaury
Zeltnera venusta - charming centaury, canchalagua
Zeltnera wigginsii

References

 
Gentianaceae genera